Culprits (Spanish: Culpables) is a 1960 Spanish drama film directed by Arturo Ruiz Castillo and starring Anna Maria Ferrero, Fernando Rey and Lina Rosales.

Cast
 Anna Maria Ferrero as Margarita  
 Fernando Rey as Mario  
 Lina Rosales as Mercedes  
 Pastor Serrador as Ignacio 
 Jacques Sernas as Emilio  
 Roberto Camardiel as Antonio  
 Lorenzo Robledo as Alberto  
 Pilar Caballero as Susana  
 Manuel Guitián as Amigo #1  
 Rufino Inglés as Amigo #2

References

Bibliography 
 Francesc Sánchez Barba. Brumas del franquismo: el auge del cine negro español (1950-1965). Edicions Universitat Barcelona, 2007.

External links 
 

1960 drama films
Spanish drama films
1960 films
1960s Spanish-language films
Films directed by Arturo Ruiz Castillo
1960s Spanish films